Richard Šechný (born 19 October 1971 in Prešov) is a Slovak professional ice hockey player.

Domestic career
He has played over 700 games in the Slovak Extraliga. He was twice named an all-star, lead the league in scoring, and led the league in assists.  He also won a league title.

He also played for HC Neftekhimik Nizhnekamsk of the Russian Superleague.

International career
He represented Slovakia at the 1999 IIHF World Championship as well as the 2002 Winter Olympics.

Career statistics

Regular season and playoffs

International

References

External links

1971 births
Living people
HC '05 Banská Bystrica players
HC 07 Detva players
HK Dukla Michalovce players
Ice hockey players at the 2002 Winter Olympics
MHK Kežmarok players
HC Košice players
HC Neftekhimik Nizhnekamsk players
Olympic ice hockey players of Slovakia
Podhale Nowy Targ players
HK Poprad players
HC Prešov players
Slovak ice hockey centres
Sportspeople from Prešov
HKM Zvolen players
Expatriate ice hockey players in Italy
Slovak expatriate ice hockey people
Slovak expatriate sportspeople in Italy
Slovak expatriate ice hockey players in Russia